Jamie Darrell Lester (/ˈlstər/; born September 7, 1974) is an American artist best known for creating ceramic, bronze, and steel sculptures that “focus on the human figure combined with imagery derived primarily from life in Appalachia, including birds, architecture, and landscape.” Lester also creates paintings, digital art, and music.

Sculpture
Lester's award-winning sculptures have been shown in galleries in Maryland, Massachusetts, West Virginia, and the United Kingdom. Many of his sculptures have been produced as commissioned public works, including statues of actor Don Knotts (along High Street in front of the Metropolitan Theatre in Morgantown, WV, 2016), basketball player and executive Jerry West (outside the West Virginia University Coliseum, Morgantown, WV, 2007), George Steinbrenner in Monument Park (Yankee Stadium), New York City, and the Brooklyn Wall of Remembrance at MCU Park in the Coney Island neighborhood of Brooklyn, NY.

In 2003, Lester designed the obverse side of the West Virginia state quarter issued as part of the US Mint's 50 State quarters program in 2005. The design features the New River Gorge Bridge.

Each year, Lester creates bronze-relief busts representing new inductees to the World Golf Hall of Fame in St. Augustine, Florida.

As of August 2021, Lester had also created over 30 statues for the Boy Scouts of America, each of which are installed at the Summit Bechtel Reserve, near Beckley, WV. Among these is a statue of Rex Tillerson, the former United States Secretary of State who served as President of the Boy Scouts of America from 2010 to 2012.

Recent work includes "Rising Cardinals" (2021),  which is located between Neville and North Heber Streets in Beckley, WV. This sculpture was part of a beautification project for the city. It features four red cardinals and was constructed with the help of Lester's business partner, engineer Jeff Edwards. During an interview conducted during the public unveiling of the work, Lester said he chose the state bird of West Virginia to symbolize Beckley “rising up.”

In an interview with Tamarack, Lester revealed that he not only sculpts in bronze, ceramics, steel, and mixed media, but also creates sculpture digitally and in virtual reality. His larger projects can take several years to complete. For example, Lester stated that he worked over 4,000 hours to create his rendering of Jerry West, while planning for his Don Knotts statue began nearly ten years before the final version was erected. Lester has stated that his artistic style is influenced by baroque, post-impressionism, and surrealism.

Painting
Lester is also an accomplished painter whose works sometimes combine his figurative representations with Appalachian themes. For example, Lester created a series of watercolor paintings showing the faces of coal miners wearing miner's helmets, which was utilized in the non-profit public awareness campaign "Remember the Miners" that launched in 2010. A watercolor series Lester created in 2005 features giantized people amid Appalachian architecture.

Early life and education
Born into a working-class family in Oceana, West Virginia, Lester began creating art at the age of three, due to the influence of his mother, a watercolor painter, and his father, a coal miner who introduced to him to whittling and fort building. Whittling and fort building, Lester explains, are "kind of sculptures."

Lester later attended West Virginia University and graduated with Bachelor of Fine Arts degree in 1997. He has continued his education by studying specific artists and styles. In 2015, Lester traveled to Rome, Italy, where he completed a course of study on the figurative sculpture of Gian Lorenzo Bernini. In 2011, he travelled to China, where he taught as a guest artist at the Jingdezhen Ceramic Institute. He also studied in the Chinese city of Hangzhou.

Vandalia Bronze and Love Hope Center for the Arts
After graduating from West Virginia University in 1997, Lester founded Vandalia Bronze in Morgantown, WV. Aside from operating as Lester's workshop, Vandalia Bronze hosts the Nampara Arts Cooperative, which provides rentable space to ceramic artists, including equipment and kilns, and public instruction.

In 2021, Lester co-founded the Love Hope Center for the Arts, a non-profit educational space in Fayetteville, WV.

References

21st-century American sculptors
1974 births
Living people
People from Wyoming County, West Virginia
Sculptors from West Virginia